Georges Ladoux (Beauchastel, 21 March 1875 - Cannes, 20 April 1933) was an army major and from 1914 the head of the Deuxième Bureau, French military intelligence during World War I. He was responsible for recruiting Mata Hari as a French spy, whom he met in Vittel in 1916. Ladoux was later arrested for being a double agent himself, but eventually cleared of all charges.

Further reading

References

External links
 Georges Ladoux (1875-1933) Bibliothèque nationale de France

French spies
World War I spies for France
1875 births
1933 deaths